AmTrust Bank was a bank based in Cleveland, Ohio. The company was founded in 1889 and was closed in December 2009.

History
The bank was founded in 1889 as Ohio Savings, Loan & Building Co.

In 1963, Leo Goldberg acquired control of the company.

In 1975, the bank acquired Citizens Federal Savings & Loan of Akron. In 1978, the bank acquired Shaker Savings. In 1989, the bank acquired Palm Plaza Savings Association, based in Boca Raton, Florida.

In 2000, the bank opened its first branches in Phoenix, Arizona. In 2007, the bank changed its name to Amtrust Bank. In January 2009, the bank sold its 5 branches in Columbus, Ohio to WesBanco.

On December 4, 2009, as a result of bank failure, the bank was shut down by the Office of Thrift Supervision. It was placed into receivership and the Federal Deposit Insurance Corporation was named receiver. The assets of the bank were sold to New York Community Bank. NYCB changed the name of the acquired branches back to Ohio Savings Bank.

References

Bank failures in the United States
Banks established in 1889
Banks disestablished in 2009
Defunct banks of the United States
Defunct companies based in Cleveland
1889 establishments in Ohio
2009 disestablishments in Ohio